Roy Nicolas Courlander, (6 December 1914 – 1 June 1979), nicknamed 'Reg', was a British-born New Zealand soldier who became an Unterscharführer in the German Waffen-SS British Free Corps during the Second World War.

Early life
Born out of wedlock in December 1914, Courlander was adopted by Lithuanian Jewish businessman Leonard Henry Courlander (1878–1970) and Edith Cater (1898–1970), who sent him to boarding school. When he was 19, his parents divorced and he was sent to live and work on a coconut plantation owned by his father in the New Hebrides in the South Pacific. His mother married Frederick Bohne in 1933 and eventually moved to New Zealand in the 1950s where she died in 1970. His father remarried Gwendoline Elmes and moved to Sydney, Australia.

In November 1938, Courlander arrived in New Zealand and found work as a clerk with the Land and Income Tax Department in Wellington. On 10 April 1939 he was arrested and convicted and sentenced to 9 months imprisonment for breaking and entering a Napier house of Kathleen Reeston with John Matterson and Geoffrey Keen. Courlander and Keen's sentences were reduced on appeal to 18 months probation from 14 June 1939. Courlander held that his reason for going to the house was for a meal and that this was at Keen's invitation. Courlander moved to Auckland on 30 September 1939 and married Joan Beryl Marchand there.

Military life - Allies

New Zealand Army
On the outbreak of war, Courlander was enlisted into the New Zealand Military Forces. Because of his knowledge of French and German he was placed in the Intelligence Corps. He sailed for Egypt on RMS Orion and served in Greece with the 18th Battalion.  In December 1940 he was promoted to Lance-Corporal. At Kalamata, Greece on 29 April 1941 he was captured and interned in Stalag XVIII-D at Maribor in Yugoslavia.

Prisoner-of-war
As a prisoner of war, Courlander acted as an interpreter at the camp. He joined work parties in Austria and eventually in September 1943 was sent to Genshagen camp (Stalag III-D/517) in Berlin. Courlander posed as a “White Russian émigré"  and claimed to have extreme anti-Soviet views. He participated in Nazi broadcasts to the United Kingdom.

Military life - Germans

British Free Corps
Subsequently, the Germans recruited Courlander in January 1944 for the British Free Corps. He was one of the original six members. Although the name 'Leonard Courlander' appears in some records in connection with the British Free Corps, the actual member appears to be Roy Courlander. Along with Thomas Cooper, he is said to have forcibly recruited British and Dominion POWs for the British Free Corps. By April 1944 he was promoted to Unterscharführer (sergeant). At his court martial, statements were made that Courlander was seeking to oust John Amery and take control of the Corps.

Courlander and another man, Francis Maton, left the BFC by volunteering for service with the war correspondent unit SS-Standarte Kurt Eggers, which was operating on the Western Front. Their ultimate goal was to make for the Allied lines at the first chance. Courlander and Maton removed all of the BFC insignia from their uniforms, replacing them with the standard SS patches and rank. The two men boarded a train for Brussels in the company of a Flemish Waffen-SS unit. On 3 September 1944, the two men arrived in Brussels, where they linked up with the Belgian Resistance. They participated in street fighting against the Germans, with Courlander being wounded during action. The following day, they gave themselves up to a British officer, thus becoming the first two BFC men to be arrested.

After his capture, Courlander was interviewed by British military intelligence, likely MI5. He told them that Adolf Hitler had told BFC members that if Britain was defeated, the former King Edward VIII would replace George VI on the throne and Oswald Mosley would become the Prime Minister. Courlander also provided background information on the formation of the BFC.

Court martial and imprisonment
Lance Corporal Courlander was arrested and tried by court martial by the New Zealand military authorities in Westgate-on-Sea near Margate in Kent, England. On 3 October 1945, six years to the day after enlisting, he was sentenced to 15 years in prison on a charge of "voluntarily aiding the enemy".

Prosecuting officer Lieutenant-Colonel R.A.L Hillard said that Courlander produced a series of propaganda talks designed to show how the British had failed to keep to pledges after the First World War and Trooper J.E. Wilson gave evidence that Courlander had told him he was trying to persuade the Germans to allow a corps of free British to fight the Russians. Courlander pleaded not guilty to the charge and stated that he had joined the BFC to facilitate escaping, but as that did not eventuate had sought to find a way to control and use the unit against the Germans.

In 1946, Courlander was transferred to Mount Eden Prison in Auckland. Because the court martial did not dismiss him from the Army, Courlander was still entitled to wear his New Zealand Army uniform when out of prison for medical treatment, which he did in May 1946. His wife died while he was in prison. He appealed against his sentence, and in May 1950 it was reduced to 9 years. He was released on 2 October 1951 and married Margaret Spence the same day.

Later life
Courlander obtained a job working for a business directory company and during the late 1950s was involved in the New Zealand Social Credit Political League. He moved to Australia during the 1960s to start a new life, divorcing his wife in 1968. He ended up in a small industrial town of Lethbridge Park, near Sydney, which at the time was home to many serving and former soldiers. And also another former SS soldier. 

He died in Australia in 1979 at the age of 64.

Archives New Zealand holds a record entitled 'Biography of "Roy Courlander - Traitor" by G Carr under reference R20110377.

See also
British Free Corps
List of members of the British Free Corps
Frank McLardy

References

Further reading
 Weale, Adrian, Renegades: Hitler's Englishmen. London: Weidenfeld & Nicolson, 1994. 
 "Alleged Help To Germany." Times, London, England, 2 Oct. 1945: 2. The Times Digital Archive. Web. 18 Feb. 2015.
 "Aid To Enemy Denied." Times, London, England, 3 Oct. 1945: 2. The Times Digital Archive. Web. 18 Feb. 2015.

1914 births
1979 deaths
Military personnel from London
New Zealand military personnel of World War II
British adoptees
Criminals from London
SS non-commissioned officers
Members of the British Free Corps
New Zealand collaborators with Nazi Germany
New Zealand prisoners of war in World War II
Prisoners and detainees of the British military
Prisoners and detainees of New Zealand
People who were court-martialed
British emigrants to New Zealand